Tairuma, also known as Uaripi after its location, is a Trans–New Guinea language spoken in Uaripi in Central Kerema Rural LLG, Gulf Province, Papua New Guinea.

A grammar of Tairuma was written by Ikamu and Jo in 2014.

References

Rueck, Michael J., Margaret Potter, and Badi Vila. 2010. A Sociolinguistic Profile of the Tairuma [uar] Language Group. SIL Electronic Survey Reports 2010-021.

Eleman languages
Languages of Gulf Province